Rougemont-le-Château is a commune in the Territoire de Belfort département in Bourgogne-Franche-Comté in northeastern France.

Sights and monuments
 Château de Rougemont, ruined 12th century castle
 Chapelle Sainte-Catherine, near the castle ruins

See also

Communes of the Territoire de Belfort department

References

Communes of the Territoire de Belfort